Constance E. Brinckerhoff is an American microbiologist and an emeritus professor of medicine at the Geisel School of Medicine.

Life 
Brinckerhoff was born to social worker Elizabeth E. Zimmerman and physician Maurice K. Laurence.

Brinckerhoff earned a B.A. in biology, cum laude, in 1963 at Smith College. She completed a M.A. (1966) and Ph.D. (1968) in microbiology and immunology at University at Buffalo.

Brinckerhoff was the director of bacteriology at Brattleboro Memorial Hospital from 1969 to 1971. In 1972, she joined the Geisel School of Medicine as a research associate and postdoc with rheumatologist Edward Harris. She became the Nathan Smith Professor of Medicine and Biochemistry in 1993. She was the acting provost of Dartmouth College from 1998 to 1999. In 1999, Brinckerhoff was awarded a MERIT grant (Method to Extend Research in Time)  from the National Institute of Arthritis and Musculoskeletal and Skin Diseases.

Brinckerhoff is an emeritus professor of medicine.

References

Citations

Bibliography 

Living people
Year of birth missing (living people)
Place of birth missing (living people)
20th-century American biologists
21st-century American biologists
20th-century American women scientists
21st-century American women scientists
American microbiologists
Women microbiologists
American medical researchers
Women medical researchers
Smith College alumni
University at Buffalo alumni
Geisel School of Medicine faculty